Magoniella is a monotypic genus of flowering plants belonging to the family Polygonaceae. The only species is Magoniella obidensis.

Its native range is Costa Rica, Venezuela to Brazil and Bolivia.

References

Polygonaceae
Monotypic Polygonaceae genera